The Kirāta, Kiranti or Kirati is a generic term in Sanskrit literature for people who lived in the mountains, particularly in the Himalayas, North-East India and who are postulated to have been Mongoloid in origin.

References

 

Tribes of India